Lavoisiera is a genus of plants in the family Melastomataceae. Species include Lavoisiera canastrensis.

Melastomataceae
Melastomataceae genera